Mycoleptodonoides sharmae is a species of tooth fungus in the family Meruliaceae. It was described as new to science in 2013 by mycologists Kanad Das, Joost Stalpers, and J. Benjamin Stielow. The specific epithet sharmae honours Jai Ram Sharma, "for his contribution to the Indian mycobiota". The type collection was made in Shingba Rhododendron Sanctuary, a nature park in Sikkim, India. The fungus was found fruiting on a decaying tree trunk of a unidentified broad-leaved tree.

References

Meruliaceae
Fungi described in 2013
Fungi of India